The Villanova School of Business is Villanova University's business school and offers seven undergraduate degrees, six graduate programs, an executive MBA program, and several executive education programs. The programs are accredited by the Association to Advance Collegiate Schools of Business (AACSB). Located in Villanova, Pennsylvania (part of Radnor Township), Villanova School of Business has been ranked among the top business schools in the nation for the last ten years.

History

The Villanova School of Business (VSB) was founded in 1922 by Father Joseph C. Bartley, a former dean. Originally known as "The College of Commerce And Finance" it was renamed "The Villanova School Of Business" in 2006.  Villanova was founded by the Roman Catholic Order of Saint Augustine.

In addition to serving as a home base for faculty and administration offices, Bartley Hall includes 33 classrooms, 6 lecture halls, a 130-seat auditorium, and the Curley Exchange, a dining, studying, and meeting facility.

The school has  over 100 full-time faculty members, 90% of which hold the highest degrees in their respective fields, and six "Centers or Institutions of Excellence".

Academics
As of Spring 2019, 1,739 undergraduate students were enrolled full-time in the VSB undergraduate business program and 1,066 graduate students were enrolled. Undergraduate VSB Students take half of their required courses in the College of Liberal Arts and Sciences.

The Clay Center and O'Donnell Center for Professional Development 

The Clay Center at VSB along with the Charlotte and James V. O’Donnell ’63 Center for Professional Development offers academic advising and planning, support for internships and CoOps, and professional development opportunities.

Undergraduate Admissions 
For the class of 2022, the number of applications received for admissions was over 6,600, with the matriculation of the incoming class being 413. The SAT mid-range scores for typically accepted students was 1350-1480 and the mid-range GPA was 4.06-4.42. For the class of 2021, the number of applications increased by 37.5% and the SAT mid-range scores for accepted students was 1340-1480 and the mid-range GPA was 3.92-4.29.

Rankings

Graduate
Overall, the college's graduate programs were ranked:
 #2 by U.S. News & World Report in 2019
 #1 by U.S. News & World Report in 2018

The MBA program was specifically ranked:
 #13 by U.S. News & World Report in 2019
 #12 by Bloomberg Businessweek in 2015, including rankings of #15 in both the student and alumni surveys

Undergraduate
Overall, the college's undergraduate programs were ranked:
 #8 by Poets & Quants in 2019
 #1 by Bloomberg Businessweek in 2016, including rankings of #2 in its employer survey, #10 in its student survey, and #15 in its ranking of internship
 #36 for Best Undergraduate Teaching by U.S. News & World Report in as well as 2021 #64 among "Best Value Schools"

References

Business schools in Pennsylvania
Villanova University